Fantasize is the second studio album by American indietronica band Kye Kye, which was released on January 21, 2014, by Valga Records, and it was produced by Chad Howat. This album was funded through a Kickstarter campaign. The album attracted commercial successes and positive critical attention.

Background
The album Fantasize is the second studio album by the American indietronica group Kye Kye, which it released on January 21, 2014 by Valga Records, and it was produced by Chad Howat in Nashville, Tennessee. This album was paid for by a Kickstarter funding campaign.

Critical reception

Fantasize received generally positive reception from music critics. Matt Conner of CCM Magazine rated the album four stars out of five, remarking how it is a "stellar follow-up" to Young Love that is "a well-produced set." At Knoxville News Sentinel, Chuck Campbell rated the album four out of five stars, stating that the release "is impressively cinematic and capable of quickly whisking listeners away into a nebulous world of gossamer electronic strains and untethered vocals." Ian Zandi of Indie Vision Music rated the album a perfect five stars, writing that "the perfect word to describe this album. Heavenly."

Commercial performance
For the Billboard charting week of February 8, 2014, the album charted at Nos. 7 and 50 on the Top Heatseekers Albums and Independent Albums charts.

Track listing

Chart performance

References

2014 debut albums
Kickstarter-funded albums
Kye Kye albums